Jorge Frias (born 15 March 1956) is a Mexican wrestler. He competed at the 1976 Summer Olympics and the 1980 Summer Olympics.

References

1956 births
Living people
Mexican male sport wrestlers
Olympic wrestlers of Mexico
Wrestlers at the 1976 Summer Olympics
Wrestlers at the 1980 Summer Olympics
Place of birth missing (living people)
Pan American Games medalists in wrestling
Pan American Games gold medalists for Mexico
Wrestlers at the 1975 Pan American Games
Medalists at the 1975 Pan American Games
20th-century Mexican people